Amy Mastura Suhaimi (born 10 May 1971) is a Malaysian singer and actress.

Her entertainment career began in the music industry, following her performance at the 1993 Asia bagus talent show in Japan. Her self-titled debut studio album was released the following year under PonyCanyon, and she won the 1995 Penyanyi Wanita Popular (Popular Female Artiste) award. Of her studio albums, the most popular are Amy Mastura and Pujaanku, both of which were certified Double Platinum, and Puteri, which was certified Platinum. Mastura also performed a duet with American pop singer Tommy Page, titled "The Best Part". Her single, "Bintang Hati" from her 2000 third studio album of the same name, garnered her another award, this time as the Best Pop Rock Song in 2000 Juara Lagu awards.

Mastura first ventured into the film industry in 1994 with the film Kuala Lumpur Universiti few months before her debut album released, but she gained prominence in 1996's Tragedi Oktober, which was a local hit. She gained another hit the following year with Aziz M. Osman's Puteri Impian, a highly acclaimed romantic comedy for which she portrays Nora Mat Jidin, a factory girl who likes to dream and then later to join the reality TV to pursue her dream to be a princess. Through the film, she has won the best actress award at the Malaysia Film Festival in 1999. She then once again nominated for best actress for her dual-role comedic performance as well as receive another nomination for best original story for her works with Aziz in Bintang Hati (2004). She is now actively appears in local television dramas playing both comedy and dramatic roles.

In early March 2011, Mastura became the new ambassador for Kose, a Japanese cosmetic line. She became the first Malay woman to be the ambassador for Kose.

Throughout her career as a performer, Amy Mastura has recorded and produced seven studio albums, three compilation albums and recorded 93 songs and singles, her album sales reached 5 million units.

Early life
Amy Mastura was born on 10 May 1971 in Batu Gajah, Perak. She is the younger child of two siblings. She has an older brother. Her mother, Che Pora Din had portrayed as Nora's aunt in Puteri Impian 2 while her father is a retired soldier. Mastura and her older brother were raised in Ipoh. Her cousins, Mazuin Hamzah and Mazlan Hamzah entered showbiz first and are members of Malaysian band, Quinary M which was popular in the 1980s. Her career was managed by her cousin, Nana since with Sony Music Malaysia.

Career
Amy Mastura began her early career as a stewardess with Malaysia Airlines (MAS) from 1989 to 1994. She has family ties with Mazuin Hamzah as cousin, thus, musical career is synonymous with her. Mastura joined the music career via Asia Bagus competition in Japan and as a result, she won the competition and defeating other Asian new talents. She signed with the Japanese record label Pony Canyon where she was their recording artiste until 1999.

She was first introduced through a song titled, Harapan Semalam, a duet song with composer Azmeer. Her self-titled debut album was released in 1994, a year after she won the Asia Bagus, notable singles from the album are Meniti Hari, Jawapan Kasih and Kasih became hits in the radio airwaves. Her first single, Meniti Hari entering the 10th Anugerah Juara Lagu. She won the Popular Female Singer category at the Anugerah Bintang Popular Berita Harian 1994 and defeating other singers such as Fauziah Latiff and Shima. She also nominated in Best New Female Artist and Best Female Vocal Performance at the Anugerah Industri Muzik 1995. She left Malaysia Airlines in the end of 1994 to focus on her musical career.

She collaborated with the American singer and songwriter, Tommy Page through a song titled, The Best Part. She was also a VJ on MTV Syok produced by MTV in 1995. On 1 May 1996, her second album Pujaan Ku was released and later followed by her third album, Puteri, on 4 November 1997.

Besides music, she was also a sought-after actress when she appeared in her first film, Kuala Lumpur Universiti with Azhar Sulaiman, the film was not released until 1999. This was followed by her second movie, Impian and later followed by her other films including Tragedi Oktober and Puteri Impian. The film eventually earned a win for Mastura in the Best Actress category at the 1999 Malaysian Film Festival. She also acted in several dramas and telemovies and active in theatrical works.

Her success in acting career has opened the public eye when she worked under the guidance from film director Aziz M. Osman. Both Puteri Impian films gained the box office in Malaysian film industry and earned Amy the Most Popular Film Actress in ABPBH 1999. During the 14th Malaysian Film Festival, she won Best Actress and defeated other actress such as Vanida Imran, Nasha Aziz and Normah Damanhuri. She is the only Best Female Vocal Performance finalist at the AIM to win the FFM's Best Actress.

In 2000, Amy joined Sony Music after her contract with Pony Canyon ended in 1999. Her fourth album, Bintang Hati was released and this was her first album with Sony Music. Three singles from the album, Bintang Hati, Sha Na Na and Siapalah Aku became hits and achieved in local radio charts. At the end of 2000, Mastura began her theatrical debut, entitled Siti Di Alam Fantasi at the Istana Budaya.

In 2001, she appeared in Toll Gate Girl directed by Osman Ali where she played as Markonah, together with actress Rita Rudaini and her co-star, Rashid Salleh and gained positive feedback from fans who had been waiting for her movie appearance. Her fifth album, Akan Datang was released a year later, Mastura remains popular as a singer even after becoming a wife and mother. The album won the Best Album Cover and the Kasih Suci music video won the AIM 2002. She also appeared in Cinta 3 Musim jointly produced by her own company, Amy Mastura Entertainment and Aziz M. Osman's Ace Motion Pictures where the drama VCD was released via three stages in 2003. Her husband also appeared as a supporting cast. In 2004, Mastura appeared in two films directed by Aziz, a musical film titled Bintang Hati where she portrayed two characters, Syakila (a popular singer) and Tasha (Syakila's manager); and the other one is a suspense thriller film, titled Trauma where she played as Nurul.

In 2005, Amy Mastura released her sixth album, Lebih Baik, however, the album received a negative feedback when its first single, Bukakanlah Pintu failed to reach listeners' attention. Notable singles include Bingung , Kasihku Sinar and Cinta. She also appeared in a comedy series, Puteri starring Nora Danish. Later on, Mastura appeared in several dramas such as Kasut Tumit Tinggi. In 2007, she hosted a lifestyle program, Casa Impian which formerly aired on Astro Ria and moved to TV3.

Her seventh album, Happy was released in 2009 but failed to highlight her as a singer as she is more prominent in acting career. She appeared in three films in 2010, Damping Malam, Hooperz and Aku Tak Bodoh.

After appearing in Siti Di Alam Fantasi, she appeared in her second theatrical works entitled, Gamat which also starred her daughter, Adalia. A year later, she became the ambassador of the Japanese cosmetical brand, Kose and made her the first Malay woman to become the spokesperson for the brand.

Between 2012 and 2015, she released two new singles, Tapi Itu Dulu and Jom Menari... Lerr from her upcoming album to be released soon. In June 2015, she decided to wear a hijab. In 2016, Amy Mastura released her new single, "Kalimah", it was her last recording before retired from her singing career after exactly 24 years.

In 2017, Amy will be starring in a drama called Jejak Karmila. The drama will be aired on TV3. On 7 September, Amy alongside 15 others celebrities will participate in  Super Spontan Superstar 2017 which is a reality comedy shows on Astro Warna. She made it in top 8 with Shuib Sepahtu thus eliminated her in semi-finals.

Other ventures
Besides singing and acting, Mastura also played her role as the product endorser and spokesperson where she has become the endorser for several products such as Quaker Oat, Omega watch, Cif, Maggi Cukup Rasa and other products.

Personal life
Throughout her career, Amy Mastura has been known as a very disciplined artist and free from gossip.

She married with her longtime friend who is also an oil rig engineer, Alvin Tham Suffian on 1 July 2000 and they have two daughters, Adriana and Adalia. Their marriage was held in Ipoh, Perak and dubbed as the "Wedding of the Year". She also has a family ties with international football player, Nazmi Faiz.

Discography

Studio albums

Compilation albums

Remix album

Soundtrack album

Filmography

Film

Telemovie

Television series

Theatre

Television

Videography
 Hanya Untukmu (1996)
 Amy Mastura Video Hits (2000)
 Bintang Karaoke : Amy Mastura (2002)
 Amy Mastura MTV Karaoke (2004)
 Keunggulan Amy Mastura VCD Karaoke (2005)

Concerts
 Amy Mastura Live in Concert 2000 @ Life Centre (2000)

Television hosting

TV Programs
 MTV Syok @ MTV Channel (Asia) (1995–1997)
 Casa Impian (Season 7) @ TV3 (2007)
 Kraft Single With Kids @ ntv7 (2008)
 Apa-Apa Aje Musim Kelima @ TV3 (2009)

Awards
 Anugerah Juara Lagu 1994 @ TV3 (1994)
 Anugerah Skrin 1995 @ TV3 (1995)
 Anugerah Juara Lagu 2005 @ TV3 (2005)
 Anugerah Bintang Popular Berita Harian 2013 @ TV3 (2014)
 Anugerah Bintang Popular Berita Harian 2014 @ TV3 (2015)

Awards and achievements

Anugerah Industri Muzik

Malaysia Film Festival

Anugerah Bintang Popular Berita Harian

Anugerah Juara Lagu

Muzik-Muzik Semi-final

References

External links
 
 

1971 births
Living people
Malaysian actresses
Malaysian women pop singers
Malaysian pop rock singers
Malaysian rhythm and blues singers
Malaysian soul singers
Malaysian people of Malay descent
People from Perak
Malaysian Muslims
Malay-language singers
21st-century Malaysian women singers